Monoon harmandii is an Asian tree species in the family Annonaceae and tribe Miliuseae.  It is endemic to Vietnam, where it may be called nhọc lá lớn (or quần đầu Harmand) and was named by Jean Baptiste Louis Pierre of the Saigon Botanic Gardens.

References

External Links 
 
 

Annonaceae
Flora of Indo-China